3 Godfathers is a 1948 American Western film directed by John Ford and filmed (although not set) primarily in Death Valley, California. The screenplay, written by Frank S. Nugent and Laurence Stallings, is based on the 1913 novelette The Three Godfathers by Peter B. Kyne. The story is something of a retelling of the story of the Three Wise Men in an American Western context.

Ford had already adapted the novelette once before in Marked Men (1919)—a silent film thought to be lost today. He decided to remake the story in Technicolor and dedicate the film to the memory of long-time friend Harry Carey, who starred in the previous movie. Carey's son, Harry Carey, Jr., plays one of the title roles in this 1948 film.

Plot
Three rustlers—Bob Hightower (John Wayne), Pete (Pedro Armendáriz) and The Abilene Kid (Harry Carey Jr.)—ride into Welcome, Arizona. They have a friendly conversation with Sheriff Buck Sweet (Ward Bond) and his wife (Mae Marsh), who asks if they have seen her niece and her husband on the trail. The three subsequently rob the local bank, but the loot is lost when Kid is shot and his horse falls. They flee into the desert on two horses, pursued by Sweet and his men in a buckboard. Sweet shoots a hole in their water bag and then turns back to the depot.

The fugitives come within sight of the railroad's water tank, only to see Sweet station a guard. Doubling back to Terrapin Tanks, a granite sump at the edge of the desert, the robbers lose their horses in a sandstorm. Desperate for water, they find the tanks dynamited by a tenderfoot, who disappeared chasing his thirsting horses. In a covered wagon nearby lies the man's wife—Sweet's niece-in-law (Mildred Natwick)—who is in labor. While Pete helps with the delivery, the other two laboriously collect water from nearby cacti. Many hours later, the woman has a boy, whom she names "Robert William Pedro Hightower" after her benefactors. Before dying, she exacts a promise from them to save him and be his godfathers.

Moved, the three desperadoes keep their vow. They find a chest filled with baby things, condensed milk, an advice book, and a Bible. Pete offers Bob the Bible for guidance, but Bob slaps it aside. Kid, certain that a higher power guided them there, compares the baby to the infant Jesus in the manger and themselves as the Three Wise Men. Inspired by a Bible verse, they head for the town of New Jerusalem, across the desert and over a mountain. The posse later comes upon the abandoned wagon, and recognizing the possessions of his niece-in-law, Sweet believes that the fugitives killed her and sets out for revenge.

When they cross a salt flat, Kid collapses and dies. Once past the flat, Pete trips, breaking his leg. He asks Bob to leave him his pistol, "for coyotes"; as Bob walks toward the mountain, he hears a single gunshot. Staggering through a ravine, Bob finally falls, but in his delirium the ghosts of his two friends refuse to let him give up. Finding a donkey and her colt at the end of the ravine, he uses them to reach New Jerusalem, where he stumbles into a cantina to get drinks for himself and the baby. Just as Sheriff Sweet catches up with him, Bob collapses from exhaustion.

Bob is jailed in Welcome, but with his heroic rescue of the baby, the entire town has become sympathetic towards him. Bob gives his godchild into the temporary custody of the Sweets, now his friends, but when the judge (Guy Kibbee) asks him to give up custody permanently in exchange for a suspended sentence, he refuses to break his promise to the baby's mother. Pleased, the judge gives him the minimum sentence of a year and a day; and as he leaves for prison, all the townspeople give Bob a rousing farewell.

Cast

 John Wayne as Robert Marmaduke Hightower
 Pedro Armendáriz as Pedro Encarnación Escalante y Rocafuerte, a.k.a. "Pete"
 Harry Carey Jr. as William Kearney, a.k.a. "The Abilene Kid"
 Mildred Natwick as Dying Mother
 Ward Bond as Sheriff Buck Sweet
 Mae Marsh as Mrs. Sweet
 Jane Darwell as Miss Florie
 Guy Kibbee as Judge
 Hank Worden as Deputy Curly
 Dorothy Ford as Ruby Latham
 Charles Halton as Oliver Latham
 Jack Pennick as Luke
 Fred Libby as Deputy
 Ben Johnson as Posseman #1
 Michael Dugan as Posseman #2
 Francis Ford as Drunken Old-Timer at Bar
 Richard Hageman as Saloon Pianist
 Ruth Clifford as Woman in Bar
 Jack Curtis as Bartender #1
 Harry Tenbrook as Bartender #2
 Gertrude Astor as Townswoman #1
 Eva Novak as Townswoman #2
 Amelia Yelda as Robert William Pedro Hightower (the baby boy)

Points of interest
This film was dedicated to John Ford's friend and early star, Harry Carey, who died in 1947. At the beginning, stuntman Cliff Lyons is shown silhouetted against a sunset, riding Carey's favorite horse, Sonny, over the words: "To the Memory of Harry Carey,  bright star of the Western sky..."

The opening credits say "Introducing Harry Carey, Jr." but this was not his first appearance on screen. He had been in at least five pictures before this one. Young Carey had had a close relationship with Ford until this picture, but found himself the target of verbal and physical abuse that shocked him. John Wayne explained that Ford did this to everyone as a way of getting the performances he wanted. The acerbic director showed some real sensitivity when he made young Carey go home early one day. The tribute segment described above was going to be filmed, and Ford wanted to spare him.

The senior Carey starred in the first film version, The Three Godfathers (1916) playing Bob Sangster, a former horsethief who is trying to go straight. In the remake Marked Men (1919), directed by John Ford, he played Harry, a prison escapee who also survives the ordeal, finding love on the way.

Hell’s Heroes (1930), directed by William Wyler, stars Charles Bickford as Bob Sangster, a true desperado, who originally plans to rape the woman in the wagon, and in the end saves the baby by drinking from a poisoned waterhole, knowing it will give him enough time to get to safety.

Three Godfathers (1936), stars Chester Morris as Bob, a ruthless killer, with Lewis Stone and Walter Brennan as members of the gang. He also uses the poisoned well.

In the 1948 version no one is killed during the robbery, and the loot is small. It is lost before they leave town and is never mentioned again. In the 1930 and 1936 versions, which are grimmer, the bad guys are very bad, people are killed during the robbery, and saddlebags full of stolen gold play a crucial role. Film critic Leonard Maltin prefers Hell’s Heroes as the "most satisfying, least sentimental"  of all the films. He praised the “underrated” 1936 version as "beautifully shot and warmly acted".

Maltin describes the 1948 film as "sturdy, sentimental, sometimes beautiful", but feels that the  last scene "didn't ring true".

Reception
The film has maintained its positive reception. It holds an 82% "Fresh" score on Rotten Tomatoes based on 11 critics.

According to MGM records, the film earned $2,078,000 in the US and Canada and $763,000 overseas, resulting in a profit of $450,000.

See also
 John Wayne filmography
 List of American films of 1948
 List of Christmas films
 Tokyo Godfathers – a Japanese anime film based on the same book

References

External links
 
 
 
 

1948 films
1948 Western (genre) films
American Christmas films
American Western (genre) films
Films based on Western (genre) novels
Films directed by John Ford
Films set in Arizona
Films shot in the Mojave Desert
Metro-Goldwyn-Mayer films
Films based on American novels
1940s Christmas films
1940s English-language films
1940s American films